Trillium discolor, the mottled wakerobin, pale yellow trillium, or small yellow toadshade, is a species of flowering plant in the family Melanthiaceae. It is native to areas of the Savannah River drainage system of Georgia, North Carolina and South Carolina such as Steven's Creek Heritage Preserve and Lake Keowee. It is found along moist stream banks in upland woods, on acidic to basic soils.

Description

Trillium discolor is a perennial herbaceous plant that blooms mid April to early May. It has a flower with pale yellow petals that stand upright at the junction of the three leaf-like bracts.

Bibliography

References

External links

 
 Images from the U.S. National Herbarium Plant Image Collection
 Lake Keowee Reserve
 Biodiversity Information Serving Our Nation (BISON) occurrence data and maps for Trillium discolor

discolor
Flora of the Southeastern United States
Plants described in 1831